Nikolai Nikolayevich Bondarenko (born 3 June 1985) is a Russian opposition politician and blogger, who served as Member of the Saratov Oblast Duma from 2017 until his expulsion in 2022. A member of the Communist Party, he was a candidate at the 2021 Russian legislative election.

Bondarenko was previously a Member of the Saratov City Duma from 2011 to 2016, and he is well known for his confrontational nature and criticism of the ruling United Russia party.

Early life
Nikolai Bondarenko was born in Saratov on 3 June 1985. After finishing school, he attended the Saratov State Academy of Law and graduated in 2007.

Career
In 2011, Bondarenko was elected to the Saratov City Duma through party lists, despite losing in his constituency. In 2017, he was elected to the Saratov Oblast Duma as a member of the Communist Party.

In 2018, Bondarenko became known for his harsh criticism of the government in regards to the pension reform and supported the protests against the reform. In October, he was detained after attending a protest in Saratov. Bondarenko also staged an experiment trying to survive on the monthly pension of 3,500 rubles and called it "genocide". In 2020, Bondarenko was put forward as a candidate for post of representative to the Federation Council from the Saratov Oblast Duma (In Russia, half of the Senators are elected by the regional parliaments, of the subjects which they represent).

On 8 February 2021, Bondarenko was detained on charges of violating protest rules. His colleagues said he attended the pro-Navalny protests on 31 January as an observer. Olga Alimova, the Saratov regional branch leader of the Communist Party, linked Bondarenko's detention with his stated plans to run for the State Duma elections later in the year, where he would compete with State Duma speaker Vyacheslav Volodin and is considered a strong challenger. The leader of the Communist Party, Gennady Zyuganov, said he would defend him in court and fight for his release. A commission of the Saratov Oblast Duma also accused Bondarenko of corruption for receiving advertising revenues and donations through his YouTube channel. In response, he called the accusation "absurd" and politically motivated. The Saratov Oblast Duma, by a majority vote, adopted a draft resolution declaring that Bondarenko violated the law. A court also fined him 20,000 rubles, which he appealed.

In 2021, Bondarenko announced that he is running for the State Duma from the Balashov constituency in the 2021 Election. However, there have been rumors that the Central Election Commission may ban Bondarenko from running. Indeed, he was investigated for “extremist” association, though the matter was ultimately dismissed in court. Bondarenko lost the controversial election to the United Russia candidate by a significant margin.

In February 2022, Bondarenko was impeached from the Saratov Oblast Duma by a vote from other deputies on the grounds of improperly declaring donations to his YouTube channel. He argued that the expulsion was politically motivated, and his fellow Communist deputies walked out of the session in protest.

In July 2022, Bondarenko announced that he is running for his old seat (4th constituency) in the 2022 Saratov Oblast Duma election in September.

Electoral history

|-
! colspan=2 style="background-color:#E9E9E9;text-align:left;vertical-align:top;" |Candidate
! style="background-color:#E9E9E9;text-align:left;vertical-align:top;" |Party
! style="background-color:#E9E9E9;text-align:right;" |Votes
! style="background-color:#E9E9E9;text-align:right;" |%
|-
|style="background-color: " |
|align=left|Andrey Vorobyev
|align=left|United Russia
|121,326
|52.50%
|-
|style="background-color: " |
|align=left|Nikolai Bondarenko
|align=left|Communist Party
|67,352
|29.14%
|-
|style="background-color: " |
|align=left|Dmitry Arkhipov
|align=left|Communists of Russia
|7,861
|3.40%
|-
|style="background-color: " |
|align=left|Oleg Meshcheryakov
|align=left|Liberal Democratic Party
|6,851
|2.96%
|-
|style="background-color: " |
|align=left|Sergey Gromyko
|align=left|Party of Pensioners
|6,382
|2.76%
|-
|style="background-color: " |
|align=left|Aleksandr Fedorchenko
|align=left|A Just Russia — For Truth
|6,364
|2.75%
|-
|style="background-color: "|
|align=left|Vladimir Morozov
|align=left|New People
|4,409
|1.91%
|-
|style="background-color: "|
|align=left|Sergey Demin
|align=left|Rodina
|2,604
|1.13%
|-
|style="background-color: " |
|align=left|Ilya Kozlyakov
|align=left|Yabloko
|1,404
|0.61%
|-
| colspan="5" style="background-color:#E9E9E9;"|
|- style="font-weight:bold"
| colspan="3" style="text-align:left;" | Total
| 231,098
| 100%
|-
| colspan="5" style="background-color:#E9E9E9;"|
|- style="font-weight:bold"
| colspan="4" |Source:
|
|}

References

1985 births
21st-century jurists
21st-century Russian politicians
Living people
Politicians from Saratov
Communist Party of the Russian Federation members
Russian atheists
Russian bloggers
Russian Internet celebrities
Russian jurists
Russian YouTubers